Psedoceros reticulatus (commonly known as the mottled flatworm) is a hermaphroditic marine flatworm species that belongs to the Pseudocerotidae family.

Size 

Habitat and Distribution 
The flatworm can be found in the seabed of tropical oceans such as the Indian Ocean and the Pacific Ocean.

Reproduction 
As a hermaphrodite, the mottled flatworm reproduces by laying eggs.

Diet 
The primary diet of the flatworm consists of dead bodies on the sea floor and smaller animals.

References 

Turbellaria
Animals described in 1918